Giuseppe Catizone (born 20 September 1977 in Waiblingen, Germany) is an Italian former professional footballer.

He made his debut on the professional league level in the Bundesliga for VfB Stuttgart on 14 August 1999 when he came on as a substitute in the 68th minute in a game against SV Werder Bremen.

From 2007 he played for lower league side 1. FC Normannia Gmünd.

References

External links
 

1977 births
Living people
People from Waiblingen
Sportspeople from Stuttgart (region)
Association football midfielders
Italian footballers
VfB Stuttgart players
VfB Stuttgart II players
1. FC Saarbrücken players
Stuttgarter Kickers players
SG Sonnenhof Großaspach players
Bundesliga players
2. Bundesliga players
1. FC Normannia Gmünd players
German people of Italian descent
Footballers from Baden-Württemberg